Burripalem is an area of Tenali in Guntur district of the Indian state of Andhra Pradesh. It is located in Tenali, Tenali mandal of Tenali revenue division. It forms a part of Andhra Pradesh Capital Region.

Geography 

Demographics 

 census of India, Burripalem had a population of 3,306. The total population constitute, 1,639 males and 1,667 females —a sex ratio of 1017 females per 1000 males. 262 children are in the age group of 0–6 years, of which 145 are boys and 117 are girls. The average literacy rate stands at 73.75% with 2,245 literates, significantly higher than the state average of 67.41%.

Government and politics 
Burripalem gram panchayat is the local self-government of the village. There are 12 wards, each represented by an elected ward member. The sarpanch is elected indirectly by the ward members; the seat is presently vacant. The village is administered by the Tenali Mandal Parisha at the intermediate level of panchayat raj institutions.

Transport 

The village has road connectivity to Tenali by the Tenali–Burripalem road.

This village got adopted by Mahesh Babu after his film Srimanthudu which portraits the same concept of adoption of villages.

The Tenali railway station is 10 km from here.

Notable people 

Krishna, a Tollywood actor and ex-member of Indian Parliament who hails from Burripalem, and his son Mahesh Babu, also a Tollywood actor, adopted this village in 2015. They aim to provide clean drinking water, drainage and surfaced roads.

Education 
The primary and secondary school education are imparted by government, aided and private schools, under the School Education Department of the state. The total number of students enrolled in primary, upper primary and high schools of the village is 236.

Zilla Parishad High School is a Zilla Parishad funded school, which provides secondary education in the village.

See also 
Villages in Tenali mandal

References 

Villages in Guntur district